Mazurkas, Op. 41 is a set of four mazurkas for piano by Frédéric Chopin, composed and published between 1838 and 1839. A typical performance of the set lasts about nine and a half minutes. The set is dedicated to Chopin's friend Stefan Witwicki, a minor poet, ten of whose poems Chopin set to music as songs.

Composition

Structure
The order here is the order in the first German edition. The first French and English editions placed the C-sharp minor mazurka last rather than first.

Mazurka in C# minor, Op. 41, No. 1

Description

The first mazurka is in C-sharp minor and has a time signature of 3/4. It also has the tempo marking: Maestoso.

The Mazurka op.41 no.4 in C sharp minor should really have a subtitle: in the Phrygian mode for this is the special quality of its main theme and the crowning climax at the end. How Chopin incorporates the mode into the piece is fascinating: The mazurka starts with an outlining of the Phrygian scale as a solo right hand melody, only then repeating it with harmonization and then subjecting it to harmonic development in E major. Various episodes introduce new key areas, all very clearly marked off from one another, many developing the dotted rhythm idea from the main theme. The big dominant build-up to the climax is quite awe-inspiring both in its length (14 bars) and its ubiquitous use of dotted rhythms. In the 13 bar coda Chopin takes us back to C sharp minor and we enjoy the minor scale without the characteristic flattened supertonic of the Phrygian mode.

Musical analysis

Mazurka in E minor, Op. 41, No. 2

Description

The second mazurka is in E minor and has a time signature of 3/4. It also has the tempo marking: Andantino.

Musical analysis

Mazurka in B major, Op. 41, No. 3

Description

The third Mazurka is in B major and has a time signature of 3/4. It also has the tempo marking: Animato.

Musical analysis

Mazurka in A-flat major, Op. 41, No. 4

Description

The final mazurka in the set is in A-flat major and has a time signature of 3/4. It also has the tempo marking: Allegretto.

References

External links
 Mazurka Op. 41 No.1, No.2, No.3 and No.4,  played by Arthur Rubinstein (YouTube)
 

1839 compositions
Mazurkas by Frédéric Chopin
Music with dedications